Rhus chinensis, the Chinese sumac or nutgall tree, is a deciduous shrub or small tree in the genus Rhus. These turn red in autumn before falling.

The plant is common in East and South Asia, and is cultivated as an ornamental in temperate climates.

Galls produced on the species that are called Chinese gall, Galla Chinensis, or Wu Bei Zi (五倍子) in Chinese, are a source of gallotannins, molecules of hydrolyzable tannins. Infestation of the tree by Chinese sumac aphids  (Melaphis chinensis Bell) may lead to production of a gall that is valued as a commercial product in China.

Chinese galls are used in traditional Chinese medicine for coughs, diarrhea, night sweats, dysentery, and intestinal and uterine bleeding.  Some research has suggested that chemical compounds found in Rhus chinensis possess in vitro antiviral, antibacterial, anticancer, hepatoprotective, antidiarrheal, and antioxidant activities. However, this evidence is not substantiated by multiple international researchers.  The aqueous extracts of the gall also inhibit alpha-glucosidase activity ''in vitro.

References

External links

Plants for a Future

chinensis
Trees of China
Flora of Eastern Asia
Flora of tropical Asia
Taxa named by Philip Miller